Uroš Zorman (born 9 January 1980) is a retired Slovenian handball player and the current manager of RK Trimo Trebnje and the Slovenia national team.

During the 2012 European Men's Handball Championship he had the most assists on the tournament with an average of 5,7 per game. In addition, he was named into the tournament's all-star team as the best playmaker.

Achievements
EHF Champions League
Winner: 2004, 2008, 2009, 2016
 Third place: 2013, 2015
EHF Champions Trophy
Winner: 2004, 2008
IHF Super Globe
Winner: 2007
European Men's Handball Championship
Runner-up: 2004

References

External links
Sports-Reference

1980 births
Living people
Sportspeople from Kranj
Slovenian male handball players
Expatriate handball players
Olympic handball players of Slovenia
Handball players at the 2004 Summer Olympics
Slovenian expatriate sportspeople in Spain
Slovenian expatriate sportspeople in Poland
Expatriate handball players in Poland
Liga ASOBAL players
CB Ademar León players
BM Ciudad Real players
Vive Kielce players
Handball players at the 2016 Summer Olympics
Handball coaches of international teams